Eric Melillo  (born March 27, 1998) is a Canadian politician who was elected to represent the riding of Kenora in the House of Commons of Canada in the 2019 Canadian federal election.

Melillo is the youngest Conservative MP ever elected in Canada, and the youngest of the 43rd and 44th parliaments.

Background
Melillo graduated from Beaver Brae Secondary School where he showed political aspirations as a high-school student.  Prior to election, he studied economics at Lakehead University, worked for a non-partisan think tank in Thunder Bay (Northern Policy Institute) conducting policy analysis, served as an Associate for a Business Consulting firm, and worked as the campaign manager for Kenora—Rainy River MPP Greg Rickford.

Career

43rd Parliament
In December 2019, Melillo was appointed the Conservative Party's Deputy Shadow Minister for Diversity and Inclusion and Youth, and Economic Development Initiative for Northern Ontario.

Prior to the second session of the 43rd Parliament, Melillo was named to Erin O'Toole's Shadow Cabinet as the Shadow Minister for Northern Affairs and Economic Development Initiative for Northern Ontario. Melillo served on the Natural Resources and the Indigenous and Northern Affairs standing committees during the 43rd Parliament.

In his first term, he developed a reputation for his attention to constituency work that led to local popularity. He was re-elected at the 2021 Canadian federal election.

44th Parliament

After the 2021 election, Melillo remained in the Conservative Shadow Cabinet and was appointed to the Natural Resources Committee.

On March 15, 2022 Melillo was listed among 313 Canadians banned from entering Russia. The announcement came after Ukrainian President Volodymyr Zelenskyy addressed the House of Commons in midst of the Russian invasion of Ukraine.

Personal life
Melillo married Danaka Howden on June 3, 2022. His brothers-in-law Quinton and Brett Howden are professional ice hockey players.

Electoral record

References

External links

Living people
Conservative Party of Canada MPs
Members of the House of Commons of Canada from Ontario
21st-century Canadian politicians
People from Kenora
Year of birth uncertain
1998 births